Oyster blenny may refer to:

Hypleurochilus aequipinnis
Hypleurochilus pseudoaequipinnis
Omobranchus anolius